The 2015 Poprad-Tatry ATP Challenger Tour was a professional tennis tournament played on clay courts. It was the 1st edition of the tournament which was part of the 2015 ATP Challenger Tour. It took place in Poprad, Slovakia between 15 and 22 June 2015.

Singles main-draw entrants

Seeds

 1 Rankings are as of June 8, 2015.

Other entrants
The following players received wildcards into the singles main draw:
  Djordje Djokovic
  Juraj Šimčák
  Dominik Šproch
  Péter Vajda

The following players received entry from the qualifying draw:
  Toni Androić
  Tomás Lipovšek Puches
  Kamil Majchrzak
  Jan Šátral

Doubles main-draw entrants

Seeds

1 Rankings as of June 8, 2015.

Other entrants
The following pairs received wildcards into the doubles main draw:
  Riccardo Bellotti /  Dennis Novak
  Djordje Djokovic /  Péter Vajda
  Juraj Šimčák /  Dominik Šproch

Champions

Singles

 Adam Pavlásek def.  Hans Podlipnik Castillo 6–2, 3–6, 6–3

Doubles

 Roman Jebavý /  Jan Šátral def.  Norbert Gombos /  Adam Pavlásek 6–2, 6–2

External links
Official Website

Poprad-Tatry ATP Challenger Tour
Poprad-Tatry ATP Challenger Tour
Pop